The African Company of Merchants was established by Act of Parliament as a successor organisation to the Royal African Company in 1752. Provision was made for interested citizens to join the corporation in three cities: at foundation there were 135 members in London,157 in Bristol and 101 in Liverpool, which nevertheless had the most extensive participation in slave trade.

Liverpool members

Founding members
The following list of 101 names was published on 24 June 1752.
Several were MPs for Liverpool at some stage in their lives.

 John Armitage
 John Atherton
 John Ashton
 John Backhouse
 Thomas Ball
 William Benson
 Joseph Bird 
 John Blackburn
 Bryan Blundell
 Jonathan Blundell
 Richard Blundell
 William Blundell
 John Bostock
 George Bradley
 Edward Bridge
 George Brooks
 Joseph Brooks
 Jonathan Brooks
 William Bulkeley
 George Campbell
 Thomas Chalmer
 Robert Clay 
 John Clayton
 George Clews 
 Charles Craven 
 John Crompton
 James Crosbie
 Thomas Crowder
 Ellis Cunliffe
 Foster Cunliffe (1682–1758)
 Robert Cunliffe 
 Joseph Davis
 Edward Dean

 William Dobb
 Thomas Dunbar
 Ralph Earl
 David Eddie
 Elliott Ellams
 Joseph Farmer
 Edward Forbes
 Richard Ford
 Potter Fletcher
 James Gildart
 Richard Gildart (MP for Liverpool,1734-1754)
 John Goodwin
 William Goodwin
 Charles Goore
 James Gordon
 John Gorrell
 Robert Hallhead 
 John Hardman (MP for Liverpool,1754-1756)
 Henry Hardwar 
 Arthur Heywood 
 Benjamin Heywood
 Robert Hesketh
 William Higginson
 Captain John Hughes
 Richard Hughes 
 Thomas Kendall
 John Knight
 George Laidler
 Thomas Leatherbarrow
 Pierce Lee 
 Charles Lowndes
 Edward Lowndes
 Thomas Mears
 Joseph Manesty

 Richard Nicholas
 John Nicholson
 Edmund Ogden
 Samuel Ogden 
 Isaac Oldham
 John Okill
 James Pardoe
 John Parker
 Edward Parr
 John Parr
 William Penket
 William Pole
 Owen Pritchard 
 Samuel Reed 
 William Rowe
 Richard Savage
 Robert Seel
 Thomas Seel
 Samuel Shaw
 Robert Smith, (Broad Street, London)
 Samuel Smith 
 John Strong
 Matthew Strong 
 John Tarleton
 Henry Townsend
 Richard Townsend 
 Edward Trafford
 Levinus Unsworth
 Christo Whytell
 William Whalley
 Henry Lane White
 John Williamson
 William Williamson

References

British colonisation in Africa
Members of the African Company of Merchants
British slave traders